The Bon Marché, whose French name translates to "the good market" or "the good deal", was a department store chain launched in Seattle, Washington, United States, in 1890 by Edward Nordhoff. The name was influenced by Le Bon Marché, the noted Parisian retailer.

In 1929, The Bon Marché was acquired by Hahn Department Stores, itself folded into Allied Stores a few years later. A solid middle-range store, The Bon served largely working-class Seattle. Branches were also added in several cities of the Northwestern United States. Among them were Spokane, Tacoma, Yakima, Kennewick, Longview, Walla Walla, Olympia, and Bellingham, Washington, Casper, Wyoming, Missoula, Montana, Great Falls, Montana, Idaho Falls, Idaho, Pocatello, Idaho, and Boise, Idaho. Commonly known to customers as The Bon, the company dropped the Marché from their name in the late 1970s before reinstating it by the mid-1980s.

The Bon was known for their catchy jingles, such as the following to the tune of "The Banana Boat Song": "Day-o, One Day Sale, One day only at The Bon Marché! Save 20, 30, 40 percent (example savings)! Saturday only at the Bon Marche. Prices are down in every department! Saturday only at the Bon Marche!..." This jingle continued after the name was changed to Bon-Macy's, with the appropriate changes. In the 1960s, The Bon also used some cuts from PAMS' Series 23 jingle package, "Ani-Magic" in the 1960s.

Allied Stores was merged into Federated Department Stores in 1989. As part of its national rebranding program, Federated changed the name to Bon-Macy's in 2003. On March 6, 2005, the Bon-Macy's name was eliminated, with the stores renamed as the Macy's Northwest division of Federated. On February 6, 2008, the Macy's Northwest division was merged with the Macy's West division, based in San Francisco.

History

Origins and establishment

The Bon Marché was founded in 1890 by Edward and Josephine Nordhoff, who had moved to Seattle from Chicago. Edward Nordhoff was a German immigrant who had worked for the Louvre Department Store in Paris, which competed with the Maison of Aristide Boucicaut "Au Bon Marché" (now part of the LVMH group). Nordhoff moved to Chicago in 1881 and managed a department store in Chicago where he met his wife Josephine, who was a clerk 13 years his junior.

The Nordhoffs leased a small storefront in modern-day Belltown at 1st Avenue and Cedar Street that cost $25 per month. They invested their entire savings account into merchandise for the store and worked to attract customers away from the city's main retail district. Josephine Nordhoff stocked shelves, kept the books, and cleaned the store; she later learned the Chinook language to wait on Native American customers. To keep customers during the economic panic of the early 1890s, the Nordhoffs stocked sacks of pennies to provide small discounts. The growing success of the store allowed the Nordhoffs to relocate closer to the business district in 1896, leasing an L-shaped building at 2nd Avenue and Pike Street.

Initial growth and expansion

In 1899, at age 40, Edward died of an illness his doctor called phthisis, probably tuberculosis (Phthisis pulmonalis). Josephine remarried two years later. Her new husband, Frank McDermott, joined her and Rudolph Nordhoff, Edward's brother, in operating The Bon Marché. The store entered a period of rapid growth under the management of this trio. Sales increased from $338,000 in 1900 to $8 million in 1923. The store was enlarged twice at its Second and Pike location, in 1902 and 1911. In 1929, The Bon Marché opened at Third and Pine. That year, the store was sold to Hahn Stores of Chicago, which was acquired by Allied Stores five years later. Both corporations continued to operate the store under its original name. In 1937, The Bon Marché opened its first store outside of Washington through a merger of Boise, Idaho-based C.C. Anderson's into The Bon Marché by Allied Stores. The downtown Boise store remained in operation for more than 70 years, until early 2010, albeit as a Macy's for its final few years.

The Bon began opening additional stores after World War II. In 1949, it provided the anchor store for one of the world's first modern shopping centers, at Northgate Mall. By 1986, when Campeau Corporation acquired Allied Stores, the Bon Marché was one of the best-known retailers in the Northwest, with about 40 stores throughout the region. In 1978, the company acquired nine stores including Missoula Mercantile of Missoula, Montana. The Missoula store closed as Macy's in 2010.

The Bon also opened and operated three stores in Utah: The largest one was in Ogden, at the Ogden City Mall. The second was in Layton Hills Mall in Layton, a bedroom community north of Salt Lake City. Third was the smallest store in the entire chain - Logan. This store was located in the Cache Valley Mall. The stores in Ogden and Logan were sold to Lamonts department stores in 1988 because they weren't performing well for the company. Layton's location remained open until 1993, when it was sold to 

After yet another change in corporate ownership in 1990, the Bon ended up in the hands of Federated Department Stores, a Cincinnati-based company which also owns the Macy's and Bloomingdales chains. In 2001, The Bon Marché debuted a prototype store in Helena, Montana. The  store featured everything a typical Bon Marché had plus centralized checkouts.

Name changes

In August 2003, Federated "rebranded" The Bon Marché, turning it into Bon-Macy's. Federated also tacked Macy's onto the names of four other regional chains under its umbrella (Burdines in Florida, Lazarus in the Midwest, Goldsmith's in Tennessee, and Rich's in the Southeast). Customers had about a year to get used to that change when, in September 2004, Federated announced that all its regional chains would be renamed Macy's.

As of 2004, Bon-Macy's consisted of 50 stores in Washington, Oregon, Idaho, Montana, and Wyoming. New store signs, reading simply Macy's, were in place by January 2005. The former flagship store in downtown Seattle retains one small, original example of The Bon Marché signage; this can be seen above the north entrance of the store, at the corner of 4th Ave & Olive Way.

On February 6, 2008, Terry Lundgren announced the localization strategy and the company's plan to shed 2,550 jobs. This included laying off the Macy's Northwest headquarters and merging all of the former The Bon Marché stores under the Macy's West division.

Advertising jingle

Beginning in the 1990s, The Bon Marché used an advertising jingle for its "One Day Sale" based on the song "Day-O" by Harry Belafonte. It was used in television and radio commercials into the 2000s and later entered local pop culture.

See also
List of defunct department stores of the United States

References

Further reading
Bon-Macy's list of locations as of 2003 - The Internet Archive

External links

History of Federated Department Stores

American companies established in 1890
American companies disestablished in 2005
Retail companies established in 1890
Retail companies disestablished in 2005
1890 establishments in Washington (state)
2005 disestablishments in Washington (state)
1929 mergers and acquisitions
1989 mergers and acquisitions
Companies that filed for Chapter 11 bankruptcy in 1990
Defunct department stores based in Washington State
Defunct companies based in Seattle
History of Seattle
Macy's